The Palace of Justice (/ ) in Pristina is the seat of most of the courts of the Republic of Kosovo. It is located in the capital city of Kosovo, Pristina. Its construction began on 23 June 2011 and continued into 2014. The Palace of Justice is a project co-funded by the European Union and the government of Kosovo at an approximate cost of €30 million.

Institutions
Institutions to be located within the building: 

 Constitutional Court
 Kosovo Judicial Council
 Supreme Court
 Commercial Court
 High Minor Offences Court
 District Court of Pristina
 Municipal Court of Prishtina
 Municipal Minor Offences Court of Pristina
 Special Prosecutor Office
 State prosecutor Office
 District Public Prosecutor Office of Pristina
 Municipal Public prosecutor Office
 Liaison institutions

Notes and references

Notes

References 

Buildings and structures in Pristina